Sensibile can refer to:
 Sense datum, in the writings of J. L. Austin (pl. sensibilia)
 Leading-tone, in music